The Lu Verne City Jail, also known as the Old Calaboose, is a historic building located in Lu Verne, Iowa, United States. The city built its first jail in 1899. On May 6, 1912, they decided to build the current structure at the same location.  They sold the old building, and  C. Black completed the new  structure for $181.15.  The single-story building is composed of concrete blocks that were cast to resemble cut stone.  E.T. Barnum Ironworks of Detroit, Michigan provided the parts for the cells.  The jail housed short-term offenders, usually those who were inebriated, committed petty crimes, and later hobos.  The building also housed the fire department's hose cart.  It served as a jail until 1934 when a new city hall was built.  The jail cells were moved there at that time, and this building housed a welding shop sometime after that.  The jail cells were returned to this building in 1975, and it is maintained by the Lu Verne Historical Society.  It was listed on the National Register of Historic Places in 1992.

References

Government buildings completed in 1912
Buildings and structures in Kossuth County, Iowa
Jails on the National Register of Historic Places in Iowa
National Register of Historic Places in Kossuth County, Iowa
Jails in Iowa